James Oatley Cleeve (14 February 1864 – 8 February 1909) was an Australian cricketer. He played three first-class matches for New South Wales between 1882/83 and 1883/84 while still a student at Newington College.

Cleeve and his twin brother, John Cleeve (14 February 1864 – 7 April 1952) were born in Woolloomooloo, New South Wales to John Cleeve, Police magistrate of Penrith, New South Wales, and Frances "Fanny"  (née Oatley). The Cleve boys attended Newington College from 1881 until 1884 whilst the cricketer Joseph Coates was Headmaster.

See also
 List of New South Wales representative cricketers

References

External links
 

1864 births
1909 deaths
Australian cricketers
New South Wales cricketers
Cricketers from Sydney
People educated at Newington College
Twin sportspeople
Australian twins